Mister Maker Comes to Town is a spin-off of children's television series Mister Maker commissioned by Michael Carrington at the BBC for CBeebies. The TV series launched in 2010 and ended in 2011. Three spin-offs followed: Mister Maker Around the World, Mister Maker's Arty Party, and Mister Maker at Home, which began airing in 2013, 2015 and 2020, respectively.

Episode format
Every episode has the following sequence:

Helps a child with something they can make – Helping As Children Your Arts & Crafts
Shape dance and guessing game – Awesome Shape Dance & Games
Minute make it time – 1 Minute Your Arts & Crafts
Coloured Kids – All Art Big Color
Big surprise – For Your Art & Crafts Bigger
Time to go – Meet Tocky
At the start of every show, Mister Maker uses various objects to make a Makermobile. He shrinks himself, then the episode starts. Tocky, the cuckoo clock, gives Mister Maker a "mini maker message", a child who needs help from Mister Maker. The child tells Mister Maker what they would like to do or make something out of old things. This inspires him to do something related to them. He collects the essential items from the Doodle drawers and makes them.

When Mister Maker can't find what he needs, he honks the horn, summoning Scraps (a blue puppet with a scarf, a hat with straws and pipe cleaners on it, and googly eyes), who gives him what he wants. After they make it, Mister Maker tells us, "it's brilliant being out and about in the Makermobile; there's always so much to see and do." Then he hears a noise, then a quartet of shapes fly out and sing a silly song and dance, followed by a random shape (circle, triangle, square, or rectangle) to form a picture or find how many shapes there are.

Tocky then appears on the Makervideophone for Minute Make Time, and Mister Maker goes to a place where he can make something in a minute—usually completing it just before the timer stops. Then the coloured kids ask Mister Maker from the videophone to guess what they would make with their colourful costumes.

It is followed by A Big Surprise, where Mister Maker sees some kids who were not expecting him. The kids tell Mister Maker what they would like to do. Mister Maker tells the kids what they will do, which will give him an idea of what to do next. In the middle of making it, he wonders why not make a (insert thing related to what the Mini Makers are making here). The show ends with Tocky telling Mister Maker to go and then shows Mister Maker how to put the Makermobile back into the art box.

References

External links
 

2010 British television series debuts
2011 British television series endings
2010s British children's television series
2010s preschool education television series
BBC children's television shows
British preschool education television series
British television shows featuring puppetry
British television spin-offs
Television series by Banijay
Treehouse TV original programming